The 2012 William & Mary Tibe football team represented The College of William & Mary in the 2012 NCAA Division I FCS football season. The Tribe were led by 33rd year head coach Jimmye Laycock and played their home games at Zable Stadium. They are a member of the Colonial Athletic Association. They finished the season 2–9, 1–7 in CAA play to finish in ninth place.

Schedule

References

William and Mary
William & Mary Tribe football seasons
William and Mary Tribe football team